Shaban Kosh (also Romanized as Shabān Kosh; also known as Shabān Kosh-e ‘Olyā) is a village in Sepiddasht Rural District, Papi District, Khorramabad County, Lorestan Province, Iran. At the 2006 census, its population was 75, in 15 families.

References 

Towns and villages in Khorramabad County